The Roman Catholic Archdiocese of Mérida is a Latin rite Metropolitan Archdiocese in western Venezuela.

Its cathedral archiepiscopal see is Catedral Basílica Menor de la Inmaculada Concepción de Mérida, a minor basilica located in the city of Mérida.
It also has the Minor Basilica of Santa Lucía, in Timotes town, Miranda, Mérida municipality.

History 
 On 16 February 1778 Pope Pius VI established the Diocese of Mérida, on territories split off from the then Diocese of Caracas and Metropolitan Archdiocese of Santafé en Nueva Granada in Colombia.
 It lost territory repeatedly : on 1863.03.07 to establish the Dioceses of Barquisimeto (now a Metropolitan) and Calabozo; on 1897.07.28 to establish Diocese of Zulia;  on 1922.10.12 to establish its suffragan Diocese of San Cristóbal de Venezuela
 Pope Pius IX elevated the diocese to Metropolitan Archdiocese of Mérida on 11 June 11, 1923.
 It lost more territory to establish two more suffragans : on 1957.06.04 Trujillo, on 1965.07.23 Barinas
 It enjoyed a Papal visit from Pope John Paul II in January 1985.
 On 1994.07.07 it lost territory to establish the Diocese of El Vigía–San Carlos del Zulia
 On 3 December 2015 it was assigned another suffragan see, the newly created Diocese of Guasdualito

Statistics 
As per 2014, it pastorally served 566,519 Catholics (85.0% of 666,491 total)  on 8,109 km² in 62 parishes and 14 missions with 133 priests (98 diocesan, 35 religious), 21 deacons, 277 lay religious (59 brothers, 218 sisters) and 46 seminarians.

Leadership

Bishops of Merida
 Juan Manuel Antonio Ramos Lora, O.F.M. (1782–1790)
 Cándido Manuel de Torrijos Riguerra, O.P. (1791–1794)
 Antonio Ramón de Espinosa (y Lorenzo), O.P. (1795–1800)
 Santiago Hernández Milanés (1801–1812)
 Rafael Lasso de la Vega (1816–1828), appointed Bishop of Quito
 José Buenaventura Arias Bergara (1828–1831)
 José Vicente de Unda (1836–1840)
 Juan Hilario Bosset (1842–1873)
 Thomas Zerpa (1876), did not take effect
 Román Lovera (1880–1892)
 Antonio Ramón Silva (1894–1923)

Archbishops of Mérida
 Antonio Ramón Silva (1923–1927)
 Acacio Chacón Guerra (1927–1966)
 José Rafael Pulido Méndez (1966–1972)
 Angel Pérez Cisneros (1972–1979)
 Miguel Antonio Salas Salas, C.I.M. (1979–1991)
 Baltazar Enrique Porras Cardozo (1991–2023) (elevated to cardinal in 2016)
 Helizandro Terán Bermúdez (2023–present)

Coadjutor Archbishops
Acacio Chacón Guerra (1926-1927)
José Humberto Quintero Parra (1953-1960), did not succeed to see; appointed Archbishop of Caracas, Santiago de Venezuela (cardinal in 1961)
José Rafael Pulido Méndez (1961-1966)
Angel Pérez Cisneros (1969-1972)
Helizandro Terán Bermúdez (2022–2023)

Auxiliary Bishops
 Jose Buenaventura Arias Bergara (1827–1829)
 Juan María Leonardi Villasmil (1994–1997), appointed Bishop of Punto Fijo
 Luis Alfonso Márquez Molina, C.I.M. (2001–2013)
 Alfredo Enrique Torres Rondón (2013–2016), appointed Bishop of San Fernando de Apure
 Luis Enrique Rojas Ruiz (2017–present)

Other priest of this diocese who became bishop
Juan de Dios Peña Rojas, appointed Bishop of El Vigia-San Carlos del Zulia in 2015

Ecclesiastical province 
The Metropolitan's ecclesiastical province comprises his own archbishopric and the following Suffragan sees :
 Roman Catholic Diocese of Barinas, its daughter
 Roman Catholic Diocese of Guasdualito 
 Roman Catholic Diocese of San Cristóbal de Venezuela, its daughter
 Roman Catholic Diocese of Trujillo, Venezuela

See also
 List of Catholic dioceses in Venezuela
 Roman Catholicism in Venezuela

Sources and external links 
 GCatholic.org - data for all sections
 Diocese website
 Catholic Hierarchy 

Roman Catholic dioceses in Venezuela
Roman Catholic Ecclesiastical Province of Mérida in Venezuela
Dioceses established in the 18th century
1778 establishments in the Viceroyalty of New Granada
Mérida
Religious organizations established in 1778